The 1999–2000 Nemzeti Bajnokság I is the 49th season of the Nemzeti Bajnokság I, Hungary's premier Handball league.

Team information 

The following 12 clubs compete in the NB I during the 1999–2000 season:

Regular season (Alapszakasz) 

Pld - Played; W - Won; D - Drawn; L - Lost; GF - Goals for; GA - Goals against; Diff - Difference; Pts - Points.

1 Dunaferr SE entered 2000-01 Cup Winners' Cup as winners of 1999–2000 Magyar Kupa.

Season statistics

Top goalscorers

Number of teams by counties

Sources 
magyar bajnokságok - kezitortenelem.hu 

Nemzeti Bajnoksag
Nemzeti Bajnoksag
Hungary
Handball leagues in Hungary
1999 in women's handball
2000 in women's handball